Kégashka Airport  is located  north of Kegaska, Quebec, Canada.

Airlines and destinations

References

Certified airports in Côte-Nord